The Chinese university ranking is a ranking of universities in Mainland China compiled by Wu Shulian. He has been studying "Chinese University Ranking" since 1991 and leader of "Chinese University Ranking Research Group".

Introduction
The Chinese Academy of Social Sciences, Chinese University Alumni Association, Shanghai Jiao Tong University, and many other academic organizations constantly ranks universities in mainland China and in the World in many aspects/fields, including the general ranking, rankings of engineering, natural sciences, medicine, social sciences, law, philosophy, management, etc. This college ranking has met with controversies in China, and counters criticisms that its biased metrics debase many highly respected universities but inflate many second-tier universities.

The leader of this university ranking program is Wu Shulian, who's claimed to be a researcher at the Academy (Guangdong branch). However, his position has not been confirmed by the Chinese Academy of Management Science. There are not much information about the ranking team. Some sources claim that the team leader  Wu Shulian was born in Shandong, studied electronic engineering at Tsinghua University and got master's degree of management engineering from Zhejiang University.

The methodology of this ranking is quite similar to the Academic Ranking of World Universities. As any university ranking, this ranking has also continuously suffered with numerous criticisms.

Top 100 universities

The annual ranking has been continuously released since 1996. Top 100 universities out of 2,236 colleges and universities (general/integrated ranking) since 2002 are as below, as well as 1996 ranking.

Notes:
 
 The rank once tried category ranking in 1998. To list top 5, comprehensive universities ranking: 1. Nanjing University, 2. Peking University, 3. Fudan University, 4. Shandong University, 5. Jilin University, and technological universities ranking:  1. Tsinghua University, 2. Zhejiang University, 3. Southeast University, 4. Huazhong University of Science and Technology, 5. Xi'an Jiaotong University. However, many schools developed to be comprehensive universities soon later, including through mergers.
 Since about the year 2000 there were peaks of mergers of universities for several years, and one of the reasons for them is to become comprehensive universities.
 China University of Petroleum has two branches: One in Beijing and the other one in Qingdao, Shandong Province. The Qingdao branch is ranked among Top 100 (no. 83).
 China University of Geosciences also has two branches: One in Beijing and the other one in Wuhan, Hubei Province. Both branches are ranked among Top 100 (Wuhan no. 72 and Beijing no. 88).

Controversies
In 2009, the leader of this university ranking program, Mr. Wu Shulian, was reported to have been involved in a fee-for-ranking scandal, involving universities being able to pay money to the ranking program in order to boost their rankings. Consequently, the creditability of his ranking came under criticism. The Ministry of Education of the People's Republic of China strongly opposes all university rankings, especially those based on payment of “fees”, a ministry spokeswoman Xu Mei said. 

A study by an anonymous group from the Chinese University of Science and Technology showed that California Institute of Technology would fail to rank on the Chinese university rankings if calculated by Wu Shulian's ranking standard, which was considered ridiculous due to that university's international reputation as a leading research institution. This widespread controversy has greatly affected the credit of this ranking program and has frequently been reported on by the media.  Wu Shuliang officially responded with paper in Higher Education Development and Evaluation addressing several mistakes made by the study, including failure to correctly use the ranking method, failure to show the calculation process, meaning that the calculations cannot be repeated, inappropriately publishing classified data from the Ministry of Education of the People's Republic of China, inappropriate use of unavailable/non-equivalent indices/scores for California Institute of Technology constituting 78.79% of total indices/scores. Wu Shuliang's paper shows California Institute of Technology clearly ranks much higher than any of Chinese Universities using his published method with proper treatment.

See also
 Rankings of universities in China
 University rankings in China
 List of universities in China
 Chinese university ranking (Netbig)
 Chinese university ranking of billionaire alumni
 Project 211
 Project 985
 863 Program
 College and university rankings
 Academic Ranking of World Universities, by Shanghai Jiao Tong University’s Institute of Higher Education.
 THES - QS World University Rankings, by Times Higher Education (THE) and Quacquarelli Symonds.

References

University and college rankings
Science and technology in the People's Republic of China
Higher education in China